S. clusii may refer to:
 Salvia clusii (disambiguation), several different sage plants
 Sesamoides clusii; a flowering plant in the family Resedaceae; see Sesamoides
 Spartium clusii, the bridal broom